Samuel Mchele Chitalilo (born June 15, 1965) is a former Member of Parliament in the National Assembly of Tanzania.

References

Living people
Members of the National Assembly (Tanzania)
1965 births
Place of birth missing (living people)